Innes Senior (born 30 May 2000) is an  international rugby league footballer who plays as a er and  for the Huddersfield Giants in the Betfred Super League.

He has spent time on loan from Huddersfield at Workington Town in Betfred League 1, and Wakefield Trinity in the Super League.

Background
Senior was born in Huddersfield, West Yorkshire, England.

Along with his twin brother Louis, Innes is a product of the Giants' academy system and both made their first team debuts over Easter 2018.

Career

Huddersfield Giants
In 2018 he made his Super League début for the Giants against the Catalans Dragons.
His twin Brother, Louis, made his début in the previous game against Leeds.

Senior became the first player born in or after the year 2000 to score in the Super League when he scored a try for the Huddersfield club against Castleford in April 2018.
On 17 December 2020, it was announced that Wakefield Trinity and Huddersfield had agreed to extend Senior's loan period to cover the 2021 season.
On 28 May 2022, Senior played for Huddersfield in their 2022 Challenge Cup Final loss to Wigan.

References

External links
Huddersfield Giants profile
SL profile
Ireland profile

2000 births
Living people
English rugby league players
Huddersfield Giants players
Ireland national rugby league team players
Rugby league players from Huddersfield
Rugby league wingers
Wakefield Trinity players
Workington Town players